Re is a former municipality in Vestfold county (as of 1 January 2020 Vestfold og Telemark), Norway. The administrative center of the municipality was the village of Revetal. The municipality was established in 2002 by the unification of the former municipalities of Ramnes and Våle. It included the villages of Ramnes, Våle, Undrumsdal, Fon, Vivestad (and Revetal).  The river Aulielva ran through the district.

Snippane is situated on the border to Lardal, three kilometers south of Hof.

On 1 January 2020. The municipality became a part of Tønsberg municipality, in the county of Vestfold og Telemark.

General information

Name 
The Old Norse form of the name was Ré, and it is an old district name. The name is related to the German word Reihe which means "line" and it refers to the geological formation called Raet.

Coat-of-arms 
The coat-of-arms was from modern times.  They were granted in August 2001.  It was designed by Arvid Steen.  It showed a gold-colored five point design on a green shield.  The five points represented the five parishes in the municipality.  The design has a long history in the area.  The green was chosen to represent nature and agriculture and the gold was chosen because it goes well with green.

History 
In this area a battle took place in 1177, which is the last one mentioned in Heimskringla by Snorri Sturluson. Graves and other findings from the Viking Age and even earlier can be found throughout the district.

References

External links 
 
 
 Municipal fact sheet from Statistics Norway
 

 
Populated places established in 2002
Tønsberg
2002 establishments in Norway